John Gardener (died 1402), of New Romney, Kent was a Member of Parliament for New Romney in 1395, 1399 and 1401.

References

14th-century births
1402 deaths
People from New Romney
14th-century English people
15th-century English people
English MPs 1395
English MPs 1399
English MPs 1401